Egon Matt (5 November 1925 – 9 March 2004) was a Liechtensteiner cross-country skier. He competed in the men's 18 kilometre event at the 1948 Winter Olympics.

References

1925 births
2004 deaths
Liechtenstein male cross-country skiers
Olympic cross-country skiers of Liechtenstein
Cross-country skiers at the 1948 Winter Olympics
Place of birth missing